

Mountains by elevation

Mountains by region

Arica and Parinacota Region

Acotango
Aritinca
Capurata
Guallatiri
Parinacota
Pomerape
Taapaca
Tacora

Tarapacá Region
Alto Toroni
Irruputuncu
Isluga

Antofagasta Region

Acamarachi
Aguas Calientes
Aucanquilcha
Azufre
Caichinque
Chiliques
Colachi
Colorado
Escorial
Guayaques
Incahuasi
Juriques
Lascar
Lastarria
Licancabur
Linzor
Llullaillaco
Minchincha
Miñiques
Miño
Miscanti
Olca
Ollagüe
Palpana
Paranal
Paruma
Pular
Puntas Negras
Putana
Quimal
Sairecabur
Salín
San Pablo
San Pedro
Socompa
Toco
Tocorpuri
Zapaleri

Atacama Region

Barrancas Blancas
Azufre
Bayo
Colorados
Copiapó
El Muerto
El Ermitaño
El Fraile
El Toro
Falso Azufre
Incahuasi
Mulas Muertas
Ojos del Salado
Peña Blanca
San Francisco
Sierra Nevada de Lagunas Bravas
Solo
Tres Cruces
Tres Quebradas
Vicuñas

Coquimbo Region
Las Tórtolas
Olivares

Valparaíso Region
Alto de los Leones
Cerro de Los Inocentes
Juncal

Santiago Metropolitan Region
Arenas
El Morado
El Plomo
Cerro Leonera (4,954 m)
Marmolejo
Plomo
Risopatrón
San José
Tupungatito
Tupungato

O'Higgins Region
Alto de los Arrieros
Palomo
Tinguiririca

Maule Region

Azul
Descabezado Chico
Descabezado Grande
Longaví
Planchón-Peteroa

Bío-Bío Region

Antuco
Callaqui
Nevados de Chillán
Copahue
Sierra Velluda

Araucanía Region

Lanín - highest mountain in Araucanía Region
Llaima
Lonquimay
Quetrupillán
Sierra Nevada
Sollipulli
Tolhuaca
Villarrica

Los Ríos Region

Villarrica - highest mountain in Los Ríos Region
Cacho del Toro
Carrán
Caulle
Maltusado
Lipinza
Mocho-Choshuenco
Nevado Las Agujas
Oncol
Paillahuinte
Puyehue
Trafa
Tralcán

Los Lagos Region
Antillanca
Calbuco
Corcovado
Hornopirén
Michinmahuida
Osorno
Puntiagudo
Tronador - highest mountain in Los Lagos Region
Yanteles
Yate

Aisén Region

Arenales
Barros Arana
Castillo
Hudson
Lautaro
Macá
Melimoyu
Mentolat
Pared Norte
Puyuhuapi
San Lorenzo
San Valentín - highest mountain in Aysén Region
Steffen

Magallanes and Antártica Chilena Region

Aguilera
Balmaceda
Burney
Castillo Dynevor
Darwin
Fitz Roy - highest mountain in Magallanes Region
Sarmiento
Tarn
Torre

References 

Difrol

Chile
Mountains
Chile